PA9, PA.9, PA-9, PA 9, or variant may refer to:
 Pennsylvania highway designations:
 Pennsylvania Route 9 (1955-1996), now I-476
 Pennsylvania Route 9 (1920s), now US Route 20
 Other uses:
 PA-9, Pennsylvania's 9th congressional district
 Dell PA-9, laptop power adapter